"Older Women" is a song written by Jamie O'Hara, and recorded by American country music artist Ronnie McDowell.  It was released in June 1981 as the first single from the album Good Time Lovin' Man.  The song was McDowell's eleventh country hit and the first of two number one songs on the country chart.  The single went to number one for one week and spent a total of ten weeks on the country chart.

Charts

References
 

1981 singles
1981 songs
Ronnie McDowell songs
Songs written by Jamie O'Hara (singer)
Song recordings produced by Buddy Killen
Epic Records singles